DOMS or doms or variant, may refer to:
Doms, a Bengai Hindu caste persons 
Delayed onset muscle soreness (DOMS)
Department of Management Studies (DoMS)
 DoMS, Indian Institute of Science
 DoMS NIT Trichy
 Department of Management Studies, IIT Roorkee
 Department of Management Studies IIT Madras
Diploma in Ophthalmic Medicine and Surgery, medical degree in Bangladesh, India, England and Scotland.
A stationary manufacturing company situated in India.

People 
 Jack Doms (1927–2018), New Zealand swimmer
 Mark Doms, U.S. Under Secretary of Commerce for Economic Affairs 
 Jofré de Borja y Doms (1390-1436), Spanish noble
 Rodrigo de Borja y Doms (1431-1503), Pope Alexander VI

See also
 Dom (disambiguation), "Doms" is the plural of "Dom"
 DMS (disambiguation)
 List of acronyms: D